"Bright Lights, Big City" is a classic blues song  which was written and first recorded by American bluesman Jimmy Reed in 1961.  Besides being "an integral part of the standard blues repertoire", "Bright Lights, Big City" has appealed to a variety of artists, including country and rock musicians, who have recorded their interpretations of the song.

Background and lyrics
Called a "textbook Jimmy and Mama Reed duet", "Bright Lights, Big City" was a collaborative writing effort between Reed and his wife, Mary "Mama" Reed. It is a cautionary tale about urban life, with the narrator lamenting the loss of his wife or girlfriend to the nightlife and enticement of an unnamed city:

The song has a traditional twelve-bar blues form in Reed's signature "steady-rolling style".  It was recorded in Chicago in 1961 with Jimmy Reed (vocal and harmonica), Mama Reed (vocal),  Jimmy Reed, Jr. (guitar), Lefty Bates (guitar), Earl Phillips (drums), and an unidentified bassist.  The song was one of Reed's most popular songs and reached number three in the Billboard R&B chart as well as number fifty-eight in the pop Hot 100.  "Bright Lights, Big City" was included on the album Jimmy Reed at Carnegie Hall and appears on many Reed compilations.

Chart performance

Sonny James version

American country music singer Sonny James recorded "Bright Lights, Big City" in 1971.  An early review included: "Jimmy Reed's blues number serves as strong material for the Southern Gentleman both vocally and for some exceptional guitar work".  The song was James' fifteenth number-one hit in a row in the country chart as well as reaching number ninety-one in the pop chart.  The song is included on James' 1971 album The Sensational Sonny James and several of his compilation albums.

Chart performance

Recognition and legacy
Jimmy Reed's "Bright Lights, Big City" is included in the Rock and Roll Hall of Fame list of "500 Songs That Shaped Rock and Roll".

References

1961 singles
1971 singles
Songs written by Jimmy Reed
Jimmy Reed songs
Sonny James songs
Vee-Jay Records singles
Blues songs
1961 songs